Debagram is a village in the Kaliganj CD block in the Krishnanagar Sadar subdivision of the Nadia district in the Indian state of West Bengal. Debagram is an big V  ullage

History

Before eighteenth century (A.D.) Debagram was surrounded by jungle. This place was inhabited by few people of Bagdi caste (Barga Kshatriya). In first part of eighteenth century a Brahmin family (surname- Majumder) migrated to Debagram from Uttar Pradesh. Few years later Gopal Bandopadhyay of Ichapore married a girl of Majumder family and started to live at Debagram. Gopal Bandopadhyay and his successor Janakinath Bandopadhyay were close of Nawabs of Murshidabad. After that quickly they extended their Zamindari and wealth. At the same time many other people, mainly Brahmins, from different areas came here and a prosperous village was formed. It is believed that some Brahmins studied Vedas there. Hence the village was named ‘Bedgram'. Many years later gradually this name became ‘Debagram’. Famous scholar and writer Biswanath Ponchanan lived here.Until British invasion this was an important place for Hindu ritualistic script writers.

Geography

Location
Latitude: 23°41' north,  Longitude: 88°18' east

Debagram is a part of deltaic alluvial plain of west Bengal formed by river Ganga and its tributaries and distributaries.  It has an average elevation of 18 meters. This flat area is characterized by some ponds and low lands. The nearest river of the village is Bhagirathi. It is about 9 km away from the village centre. Debagram is situated in the north west of Nadia District. Bethuadahari (12 km away), Plassey (12 km), Katwa (18 km) and Tehatta (24 km) is located respectively to the South, North, East and West of Debagram.

Area overview
Nadia district is mostly alluvial plains lying to the east of Hooghly River, locally known as Bhagirathi. The alluvial plains are cut across by such distributaries as Jalangi, Churni and Ichhamati. With these rivers getting silted up, floods are a recurring feature. The Krishnanagar Sadar subdivision, presented in the map alongside, has the Bhagirathi on the west, with Purba Bardhaman district lying across the river. The long stretch along the Bhagirathi has many swamps. The area between the Bhagirathi and the Jalangi, which flows through the middle of the subdivision, is known as Kalantar, a low-lying tract of black clay soil. A big part of the subdivision forms the Krishnanagar-Santipur Plain, which occupies the central part of the district. The Jalangi, after flowing through the middle of the subdivision, turns right and joins the Bhagirathi. On the south-east, the Churni separates the Krishnanagar-Santipur Plain from the Ranaghat-Chakdaha Plain. The east forms the boundary with Bangladesh. The subdivision is moderately urbanized. 20.795% of the population lives in urban areas and 79.205% lives in rural areas.

Note: The map alongside presents some of the notable locations in the subdivision. All places marked in the map are linked in the larger full screen map. All the four subdivisions are presented with maps on the same scale – the size of the maps vary as per the area of the subdivision.

Climate
According to the Köppen climate classification System Debagram has a Tropical Wet and Dry or Tropical Savanna type climate. It features a long and hot Summer followed by- wet and humid Monsoon, cloudless and pleasant Autumn, mild and dry Winter, sunny and warm Spring.

Demographics
According to the 2011 Census of India, Debagram had a total population of 32,695, of which 16,832 (51%) were males and 15,863 (49%) were females. Population in the age range 0–6 years was 3,837. The total number of literate persons in Debagram was 21,294 (73.79% of the population over 6 years).

Civic administration

CD block HQ
The headquarters of Kaliganj CD block are located at Debagram.

Village administration
As per constitution of India and Panchyati Raaj Act, Debagram village is administrated by Sarpanch (Head of Village) who is elected representative of village. 
Debagram runs under the administrative area of Debagram Gram Panchayat, Kaliganj Panchyat Samity and Nadia Zilla Parishad. Debagram Gram Panchayat is composed of 28 members elected from different areas of Debagram. Examples of such areas are Satimaayer Vita, Netajee nagar, Shaktinagar (Chattagram Colony), Babupara, Siverdalan Para, Dakshin Para, Office Bagan Para, Paschim Para, Station Para, Ghosh Para, Vivekananda Para, Roy Para, Dutta Para, Power house Para, Meer Para, Danga Para, Chatterjee Para, Katwa More, Das Para, Debagram Chourasta, Panch matha More, Jampukur etc. Current Panchayat (2013 election) has 12 members of Communist Party of India (Marxist), 8 members of All India Trinamool Congress, 7 members of Bharatiya Janata Party and 1 member  of Socialist Unity Centre of India (Communist).

Economy

Agriculture is the backbone of economy at Debagram. Paddy and Jute are the principal crops grown at Debagram.  Some other important crops are wheat, Potato, Sugarcane, Oilseed. During last decade remarkable progress has been seen in the production of Vegetables and Fruits.  Now-a-days the occupational structure is changing rapidly. Modern era has encouraged the villagers to take up new occupation. These include cottage industry, Business (both wholesale and retail), Government Services, Educational Services, Private Sector Employment etc.

Banks
There are branches of 
1. State Bank of India 
2. Nadia District  Central Cooperative Bank
3. United Bank of India
4. Bandhan Bank
5. Bangiya Gramin Vikash Bank

Car showroom
There are several car showrooms in this township like Maruti Suzuki, Hero, Yamaha, Honda, Royal Enfield.

Work profile

In Debagram village out of total population, 10282 were engaged in work activities. 86.41% of workers describe their work as Main Work (Employment or Earning more than 6 Months) while 13.59% were involved in Marginal activity providing livelihood for less than 6 months. Of 10282 workers engaged in Main Work, 1252 were cultivators (owner or co-owner) while 2916 were Agricultural labourer.

Transport

Debagram is connected to the rest of the country by Debagram railway station and NH-34. Buses operated by SBSTC, CSTC, NBSTC and many other private buses provide reliable means of road transportation. Long distance Buses connect Debagram to main cities of west Bengal, such as- Kolkata (145 km), Siliguri (432 km), Howrah(153 km), Coochbehar(559 km), Durgapur(175 km), Malda(179 km), Digha(316 km) . The other means of road transport in the village include Rickshaws, Totos, Vans, Cycles,  bikes, cars etc.

Debagram comes under Eastern Railways of Indian Railway. Several trains pass through Debagram station and provide connection with many cities including Kolkata, Kalyani (91 km), Ranaghat (66 km), Krishnagar (40 km), Baharampur (46 km). Other areas connected with state highway from debagram to Tehatta, kaligunj & Katwa.

Trains passing through Debagram

Education

Debagram village has lower literacy rate compared to West Bengal. In 2011, literacy rate of Debagram village was 73.79% compared to 76.26% of West Bengal. In Debagram Male literacy stands at 76.27% while female literacy rate was 71.15%.

Colleges

 Kaliganj Government College (Estd. 2015)

Secondary and Higher Secondary Schools

 Debagram S.A. Vidyapith (Estd. 1949)
 Debagram D.K. Girls High School (Estd. 1952)
 Vivekananda Vidyabhaban High School (Estd.  1972)
 Dingel Madrasah Siksha Kendra (Estd. 1982)
 Jompukur Kalidas Bandopadhyay MSK (Estd.  2005)
 Jompukur Obaydul Memorial Girls Academy ( Estd. 2013)

Primary and Junior High Schools
 Gaharapota primary school (Estd. 1927)
 Debagram High Primary School (Estd.  1928)
 Dingel Primary School (Estd. 1932)
 Debagram Annapurna Primary School (Estd.  1943)
 Jompukur Primary School (Estd. 1954)
 Sibnagar Primary School (Estd. 1960)
 Chattagram Colony Primary School (Estd.  1962)
 Netaji Nagar Primary School (Estd. 1972)
 Kabi Rabindra Sishu Niketan  (Estd. 1985)
 Khadijatul Kubra Girls Academy (Estd. 1995)
 Debagram Bagdipara SSK (Estd. 1999)
 Debagram Office Bagan Para SSK (Estd. 2000)
 Debagram Netaji Nagar SSK (Estd. 2000)
 Debagram Dangapara SSk (Estd. 2001)
 Office Bagan Para Saroj Nalini Das Primary School (Estd. 2001)
 Netaji Sishu Shiksha Niketan (Estd. 2003)
 Jompukur Firoza Begam Primary School (Estd. 2005)
 Sultan Smriti Jr. High Madrasah (Estd. 2006)
 Station Para CLS (Estd. 2008)
 Jompukur Hazi Abdul Odud Primary (Estd. 2008)
 Adarsha Sishu Shiksha Niketan (Debagram Ktwa More (Estd. 2011)
 Medows English School (Estd. 2014)
 Bond International School (Estd. 2015)
 New Dingel Primary School (Estd. 2018)

Healthcare
There is a primary health centres at Debagram, with 10 beds.

Debagram picture gallery

References

http://www.nadia.gov.in/
https://web.archive.org/web/20100906034159/http://koeppen-geiger.vu-wien.ac.at/
 http://en.climate-data.org/
http://censusindia.gov.in/
https://web.archive.org/web/20140408180437/http://www.indianrail.gov.in/

Villages in Nadia district